Pine Ridge may refer to:

Pine Ridge (region), of northwestern Nebraska and southwestern South Dakota
Pine Ridge Indian Reservation of southwestern South Dakota
Pine Ridge Campaign of the United States Army
Pine Ridge, Alabama
Pine Ridge, former name of Pineridge, California
Pine Ridge, Citrus County, Florida
Pine Ridge, Collier County, Florida
Pine Ridge, Indiana
Pine Ridge, Kentucky
Pine Ridge, Michigan
Pine Ridge, Mississippi
Pine Ridge, Nebraska, the U.S. Census Bureau's name for the community more commonly called Whiteclay
Pine Ridge, Dawes County, Nebraska
Pine Ridge, Surry County, North Carolina
Pine Ridge, Oklahoma
Pine Ridge, South Carolina, in Lexington County
Pine Ridge, Darlington County, South Carolina
Pine Ridge, South Dakota
Pine Ridge at Crestwood, New Jersey
Pine Island Ridge, Florida
Pine Ridge Secondary School, in Pickering, Ontario, Canada
Pine Ridge (Lum and Abner), the fictional Arkansas location of the Lum and Abner radio and film series